Jeunes Agape is a Trinidad and Tobago musical-drama group.  Members include identical twin brothers Deon and Ian Baptiste. Ian (left) was the recipient of Deon's blood donor stem cells in a successful transplant procedure to treat aplastic anemia conducted by the United States National Institutes of Health.

Discography
Musical Turbulence (2000)
Trinbago Christmas Lime (Kenny Phillips) (4 songs) (2002).
Unleashing the Tempo (2005.)

Trinidad and Tobago National Music Festival Awards
Best Gospel Choir (2004, 2006)
Best Folk Choir (1995,1997,1999,2002)
Most Outstanding Folk Choir (1997,1999,2002, 2006)
Best Calypso Chorale (1999,2002,2004, 2006)

External links
Group's website (warning plays music)
NIH story

Trinidad and Tobago musical groups